The Zincirli Mosque, officially Zinzirli Mosque (meaning "mosque of the chains" in Turkish), is a historical mosque in the city of Serres in northern Greece.

The mosques is located in the southwestern corner of the city. A middle-size mosque, it comprises a central, square prayer space with a two-storey colonnaded portico on its eastern, northern, and western sides; the qibla lies in the southern side, while the entrance is from the northern. The central space is covered by a dome, while the porticoes are topped by keel-shaped domes. The pulpit (minbar) is located on the southwestern corner of the building. It is made of marble, and is one of the finest examples surviving in Greece today. The entrance features a column-supported porch topped by small domes above the spaces between the columns. While the main structure's masonry features dressed or rough stones surrounded by bricks, the porch is entirely of carefully dressed limestone ashlars.

Its architecture and layout of the building are typical of the late 16th century, following the school of Mimar Sinan, and analogous to buildings of the same period in Istanbul. The mosque was restored in 2000, but as of 2021 is not open for worship.

The Mosque is finished in late 16th century as a product of wish of Selçuk Sultan's children, who ordered Mosque to be made in memory of their mother.

References

16th-century mosques
Ottoman mosques in Greece
Buildings and structures in Serres
Former mosques in Greece
16th-century architecture in Greece
Mosque buildings with domes
Macedonia under the Ottoman Empire